Hennezel is a commune in the Vosges department in Grand Est in northeastern France.

Hennezel is located near the Vallée de l'Ourche, as well as other scenic attractions (La Hutte, Droiteval).

Points of interest
 Arboretum de la Hutte
Fauna of Darney forest and Ourche Valley include roe deer, red deer and wild cats. Darney forest is known for its oak trees.
Scenic views at La Hutte with peaceful pond and lakes, old chapel and of course the Giant trees of the Arboretum.

See also
Communes of the Vosges department

References

Communes of Vosges (department)